A boutique is a small shop that deals in fashionable clothing or accessories. The word is French for "shop", which derives ultimately from the Ancient Greek ἀποθήκη (apothēkē) "storehouse".

The term boutique and also designer refer (with some differences) to both goods and services, which are containing some element that is claimed to justify an extremely high price.

Etymology and usage
The term "boutique" entered common English parlance in the late 1960s. In Europe, Avenue Montaigne and Bond Street were the focus of much media attention for having the most fashionable stores of the era.

Some multi-outlet businesses (Chain stores) can be referred to as boutiques if they target small, upscale niche markets. Although some boutiques specialize in hand-made items and other unique products, others simply produce T-shirts, stickers, and other fashion accessories in artificially small runs and sell them at high prices.

Lifestyle
In the late 1990s, some European retail traders developed the idea of tailoring a shop towards a lifestyle theme, in what they called "concept stores," which specialized in cross-selling without using separate departments. One of the first concept stores was 10 Corso Como in Milan, Italy, founded in 1990, followed by Colette in Paris and Quartier 206 in Berlin. Several well-known American chains such as Tiffany & Co., Urban Outfitters, Dash, and The Gap, Australian chain Billabong and, though less common, Lord & Taylor, adapted to the concept store trend after 2000.

See also

 Types of retail outlets
 Types of advertising agencies

References

Retail formats